Mongolian Barbeque is a 1997 studio album by the Leningrad Cowboys.

Track listing

Personnel
The Leningrad Cowboys:
Twist Twist Erkinharju - drums
Sakke Järvenpää - vocals
Veeti Kallio - vocals
Tatu Kemppainen - guitar
Vesa Kääpä - guitar
Pemo Ojala - trumpet
Silu Seppälä - bass
Mauri Sumén - keyboards, accordion
Mato Valtonen - vocals
Mari Hatakka - Go-Go and vocals
Tiina Isohanni - Go-Go and vocals

EP
An EP of the same name was released in Finland to support this album.

CD Megamania/1000 121432 (Finland)
"There Must Be An Angel"
"Bad Wind"
"Sweet Home Alabama" (Stalker Mix)

References

1997 albums
Leningrad Cowboys albums